Tatsiana Korzh (Belarusian: Тацяна Корж; born 17 March 1993) is a Belarusian athlete specialising in the javelin throw. She represented her country at the 2016 Summer Olympics without qualifying for the final.

Her personal best in the event is 62.10 metres set in Minsk in 2016.

International competitions

References

1993 births
Living people
Belarusian female javelin throwers
Athletes (track and field) at the 2016 Summer Olympics
Olympic athletes of Belarus